The Amstetten dialect is a Central Bavarian dialect spoken in the Austrian town of Amstetten. It is a variant of the Mostviertel dialect.

Phonology

Vowels

The Amstetten dialect is very unusual among the world's language varieties in that it can be analyzed as featuring five phonemic vowel heights. The remaining  are near-close ( in narrow transcription), a series of very high vowels that approach  in their articulation.

References

Bibliography

 
 

Languages of Austria
Bavarian language
German dialects